Hermann Buchner may refer to:
Hermann Buchner (pilot) (1919–2005), former German Luftwaffe fighter ace